Fort McMurray-Conklin was a provincial electoral district in Alberta, Canada, mandated to return a single member to the Legislative Assembly of Alberta using first-past-the-post balloting from 2012 to 2019.

History
The electoral district was created in the 2010 Alberta boundary re-distribution. It was created from the electoral district of Fort McMurray-Wood Buffalo which was split in half to accommodate population growth which has occurred in the region over the past decade due to exploitation and development of the oil sands.

Representation history

The riding's first representative was Progressive Conservative Don Scott, who served one term until defeated by Wildrose leader Brian Jean. Jean subsequently changed his affiliation to United Conservative when the two parties merged. After an unsuccessful run for the party's leadership, he decided to retire from politics, vacating the seat in early 2018. The resulting by-election was won easily by Jean's former staffer and previous Grande Prairie-Wapiti candidate Laila Goodridge for the United Conservatives.

Boundary history
The district's boundaries were not altered during its brief existence. In the redistribution of 2017, the riding was abolished and will be replaced with Fort McMurray-Lac La Biche for the 2019 Alberta general election.

Election results

Graphical summary

2012 general election

2015 general election

2018 by-election

See also
List of Alberta provincial electoral districts
Fort McMurray, Alberta, an urban service area in the Regional Municipality of Wood Buffalo in Alberta, Canada
Conklin, Alberta, a hamlet in northern Alberta, Canada within the Regional Municipality of Wood Buffalo

References

Further reading

External links
Elections Alberta
The Legislative Assembly of Alberta

Former provincial electoral districts of Alberta
Fort McMurray